The Danuta, also called Armoured Train Number 11, was a Polish armoured train used by the Polish Army during the German invasion of Poland in September 1939.

History
The Danuta was built in Poznań in 1919. In August 1920, the train participated in the Battle for Warsaw, as part of the Polish 1st Army. In 1924, the Danuta was assigned to the armoured train training unit located in Jabłonna, Legionowo County. Like most other Polish armoured trains, the Danuta was modernised in the early 1930s by receiving a Ti3 type locomotive, additional guns and AA machine guns.

Second World War
After the Polish Army was mobilised in 1939, the train was assigned to the Poznań Army. In the first days of the war, the Danuta supported various Polish infantry units. On 4 September, the train was bombed by the Luftwaffe, but received only minor damage. Next the train participated in the Battle of the Bzura. On 16 September, the train helped to halt the advance of the German 24 Division and tried to withdraw towards the Polish 16 Infantry Division, but was ambushed by the German anti-tank artillery. The  damage received in the ambush and the fact that the train's ammunition supplies were almost depleted forced the commander of the train, Captain Korobowicz, to order the train to be blown up, together with the assaulting German infantry, to prevent German capture. Out of the tanks used to scout on and off the rails, five tankettes TKS were evacuated successfully and two FT-17 tanks blown up.

The composition of the train in 1939

 Flatcar
 Artillery Wagon
 Assault Wagon
 Armoured Locomotive 
 Artillery Wagon 
 Flatcar

See also 
List of armoured trains

Armoured trains of Poland